The bare-necked fruitcrow (Gymnoderus foetidus) is a species of bird in the family Cotingidae. It is the only member of the genus Gymnoderus. It is found in the Amazon Rainforest, especially near rivers. It is relatively common, but generally rarer and more local north of the Amazon River. Both sexes are overall mainly blackish, but the male has distinctive, large greyish-blue facial- and neck-wattles and greyish-white wings, which flash conspicuously in flight.

Population
Population numbers appear to be decreasing, but because it is less than a 30% decline over ten years or three generations, they are not on the Vulnerable list.

References

bare-necked fruitcrow
Birds of the Guianas
Birds of the Amazon Basin
bare-necked fruitcrow
bare-necked fruitcrow
Birds of Brazil
Taxonomy articles created by Polbot